Peace Cafés are peace-positive cafés in Canada that have declared an adherence to Manifesto 2000, in addition to fair trade, living wage, and local organic foods standards while also utilizing their space for community gatherings on social justice and peace issues.  The designation is a registered trade mark of Canadian Centres for Teaching Peace (CCTP).

Origin
In 2006, CCTP founder Robert "Bob" Stewart drafted a prospectus for creating community-based centres for public peace education, called "Peace Cafés." Initiatives began in Hamilton, Ontario, and Calgary, Alberta in 2007 to secure partnerships with existing cafés or to open completely new spaces. In December 2007, the Hamilton initiative secured a partnership with the downtown Sky Dragon Community Development Co-operative, with Robert Porter as local director. In 2008, Robert Porter extended the Peace Café family with a partnership in his rural hometown of Walkerton, Ontario, with the White Rose Coffeehouse.

As of March 2009 there are groups in Winnipeg, Manitoba, Nelson, British Columbia, Toronto, Ontario, and Calgary, Alberta working towards additional partnerships in their respective communities.

Philosophy
Peace Cafés are described as "safe community spaces dedicated to developing a Culture of Peace at the community level through dialogue, conversation, workshops, and a library of peace resources along with wholesome food and drink options."

References

External links
Peace Café web site

Peace education
Society of Canada